Eton and Castle is an electoral ward of the Royal Borough of Windsor and Maidenhead. As its name suggests, it comprises the town of Eton (which includes Eton College) and Windsor Castle. It is currently represented by George Fussey of the Liberal Democrats. Nationally, the ward forms part of the UK Parliamentary constituency of Windsor and is currently represented by Adam Afriyie of the Conservative Party.

As of 1 December 2011, there are 1,639 voters appearing on the electoral roll for the ward.

Geographical boundaries

The A332 Windsor by-pass forms the western boundary of the ward with Eton Wick. The northwestern boundary of the ward cuts through the settlement of Willowbrook. The Jubilee River north of the Eton College playing fields forms the north eastern boundary of the ward with Chalvey. The eastern boundary of the ward meets Datchet. The southern and south eastern boundaries of the ward run along the River Thames and the external limits of Windsor Castle.

History
Prior to the 2003 Royal Borough elections, the town of Eton was part of the Eton North and South electoral ward. The part of the Eton and Castle ward which is south of the River Thames belonged to the Castle electoral ward before 2003.

For the 2003 Royal Borough elections, the new Eton and Castle electoral ward was created to replace the former Eton North and South and Castle electoral wards. The remaining area of the Castle ward not included in the newly created Eton and Castle ward was transferred to the new Castle Without ward for the 2003 elections.

Electorate
The number of registered voters (British, Irish, European Union and Commonwealth citizens aged 16 or over) appearing on the electoral roll published for the ward are as follows:

 May 2003: 1,759 electors
 26 April 2007: 1,393 electors
 2 July 2007: 1,416 electors
 1 December 2009: 1,508 electors
 1 December 2010: 1,525 electors
 1 July 2011: 1,574 electors
 1 December 2011: 1,639 electors

The general population of the ward is estimated to be as follows:

 2009: 3,141 residents

Polling stations
There are two polling stations within the ward – one inside the Eton Town Council office on Eton High Street and the other in the Windsor Guildhall.

Royal Borough representation
The one seat for the councillor representing the ward in the Royal Borough is determined by the first past the post system (the candidate who receives the plurality of the votes cast). Royal Borough elections are held every four years.

Past election results

 

 * - Not taking into account informal votes (the number of which has yet to be announced by the Returning Officer)
 # - Presuming that the electorate was 1,574 on polling day

National representation

Before 1983, the town of Eton was within the boundaries of the UK Parliamentary constituency of Eton and Slough. This was consistently held by the Labour Party from its creation in 1945 to its redistribution in 1983, except between 1964 and 1966 when it was briefly held by the Conservative Party.

Between 1983 and 1997, the whole of the ward was part of the UK Parliamentary constituency of Windsor and Maidenhead which was continually held by the Conservative Party during this period.

Since 1997, the ward has formed part of the UK Parliamentary constituency of Windsor. The seat has been held by Adam Afriyie of the Conservative Party since 2005.

However, the area south of the River Thames which forms the southern part of the ward has always been part of the UK Parliamentary constituency of Windsor (except between 1983 and 1997, when it was part of Windsor and Maidenhead).

See also
Windsor and Maidenhead local elections
Elections in the United Kingdom

References

Wards of the Royal Borough of Windsor and Maidenhead
Eton, Berkshire
Windsor Castle